Thomas W. Lumsden (c. 1930 – June 24, 1955) was a Canadian football player who played for the Winnipeg Blue Bombers. He previously played for the Winnipeg Light Infantry. 
The Tommy Lumsden Memorial Trophy is presented annually to the Bombers' Top Canadian. His No. 75 number isn't officially retired by the club but is unavailable in his honour. He is a member of the Blue Bombers' Hall of Fame. 
Lumsden died in a Winnipeg hospital 1955 at the age of 25 after emergency gallbladder surgery following an "attack" while driving near Beausejour, Manitoba.

References

1930s births
1955 deaths
Canadian football guards
Players of Canadian football from Manitoba
Winnipeg Blue Bombers players